The 1890 Brooklyn Ward's Wonders baseball team was a member of the short lived Players' League. They compiled a 76–56 record, good for second place. The team was named by the press for their manager, John Montgomery Ward, who helped to organize the Players' League. After the season, the league folded, and the Wonders were bought out by the National League's Brooklyn Bridegrooms.

Regular season

Season standings

Record vs. opponents

Opening Day lineup

Roster

Player stats

Batting

Starters by position 
Note: Pos = Position; G = Games played; AB = At bats; H = Hits; Avg. = Batting average; HR = Home runs; RBI = Runs batted in

Other batters 
Note: G = Games played; AB = At bats; H = Hits; Avg. = Batting average; HR = Home runs; RBI = Runs batted in

Pitching

Starting pitchers 
Note: G = Games pitched; IP = Innings pitched; W = Wins; L = Losses; ERA = Earned run average; SO = Strikeouts

Other pitchers 
Note: G = Games pitched; IP = Innings pitched; W = Wins; L = Losses; ERA = Earned run average; SO = Strikeouts

References 
 1890 Brooklyn Ward's Wonders team page at Baseball Reference

Brooklyn Ward's Wonders season